Ethmia thomaswitti is a moth in the family Depressariidae. It was described by Andras Kun in 2004. It is found on Sulawesi in Indonesia. The habitat consists of lowland rain forests and lower montane forests.

Etymology
The species is named for Thomas Witt.

References

Moths described in 2004
thomaswitti